The Irish National Teachers' Organisation (INTO), founded in 1868, is the oldest and largest teachers' trade union in Ireland. It represents teachers at primary level in the Republic of Ireland, and at primary and post-primary level in Northern Ireland. The head office is at Parnell Square, Dublin, and there is a Northern Irish office in Belfast. The current INTO President (2022–23) is John Driscoll; John Boyle is the General Secretary and Gerry Murphy is the Northern Secretary.

Members
The union website claimed 50,042 members (43,141 in Republic of Ireland and 6,901 in Northern Ireland) as of February 2021.

General secretaries

1868: John O'Harte
1871: John Morrin
1877: J. W. Henly
1878: A. K. O'Farrell
1884: James Thompson
1891: M. O'Kelly
1894: J. Coffey
1898: Terence Clarke 
1910: Michael Doyle
1913: Eamonn Mansfield
1916: Thomas J. O'Connell
1949: D. J. Kelleher
1967: Seán Brosnahan
1978: Gerry Quigley
1990: Joe O'Toole
2001: John Carr
2009: Sheila Nunan
2019: John Boyle

Presidents

Club na Múinteoirí

Next door to the union's head office on Parnell Square is Club na Múinteoirí (the Teachers' Club) which is operated by the INTO as a space for cultural and social events, including halls, meeting rooms, a bar, and a theatre in the basement.

References

External links
 Irish National Teachers' Organisation

Trade unions in Ireland
Organisations based in Dublin (city)
All-Ireland organisations
1868 establishments in Ireland
Trade unions established in 1868
Parnell Square
Seanad nominating bodies